This is a list of gliders/sailplanes of the world, (this reference lists all gliders with references, where available) 
Note: Any aircraft can glide for a short time, but gliders are designed to glide for longer.

South African miscellaneous constructors 
 Aero-Xpert AX-1 – Aero-Xpert, Hennopsmeer (CELLIER, Peter & JORDAAN, François)
 BJ-1 design
 Beatty-Johl BJ-2 Assegai
 Beatty-Johl BJ-3
 Beatty-Johl BJ-4 1969 world gliding championships page15-16Images
 Celair GA-1 Celstar – Celair Manufacturing and Export (CELLIER, Peter & JORDAAN, François)
 Exulans (glider) (Pretoria University)
 JG-1 (glider)
 Jonker JS-1 Revelation –  Jonker Sailplanes / JONKER, Attie
 Jonker JS-3 Rapture –  Jonker Sailplanes / JONKER, Attie
 Vine 1930 glider
 Russell Whisper 2004

Notes

Further reading

External links

Lists of glider aircraft